Don W. Vaughan  L.L.D. (born June 21, 1937) is an American landscape architect based in Vancouver, British Columbia, Canada.

Biography
Vaughan was born into a family involved in the timber industry in Coos Bay, Oregon, United States. His grandfather owned a logging company called Coos Bay Logging.

In 1965, Vaughan received his bachelor's degree in landscape architecture from the University of Oregon. In 1971, he established the firm Don Vaughan & Associates. In 1974, he became the consulting campus landscape architect for the University of Victoria in Canada, a role in which he continued until 2008.  During the late 1980s, Vaughan left landscape architecture and focused on fine arts, receiving a fine arts degree from the Emily Carr Institute of Art and Design in Vancouver in 1989. In 2001, the company name was changed to Vaughan Landscape Planning and Design and Vaughan's two sons, Mark and Jeff, joined the firm. He is an adjunct professor of the University of British Columbia's School of Architecture and Landscape Architecture.

Designs
Don Vaughan's park designs are often inspired by the Millicoma River in Coos County, Oregon where he spent his childhood summers. These designs incorporate still ponds, waterfalls, and granite sculptures.

One of Vaughan's more ambitious landscapes is the 1986 Dr. Sun Yat-Sen Classical Chinese Garden in Vancouver, where he and architect Joe Wai took ten years to persuade three levels of government and private donors to fund the project, which cost $6.1 million.

Awards 
An honorary Doctor of Laws (LL.D.) degree was awarded to him by the University of Victoria in the Fall 2007 convocation. He is a Fellow of the American Society of Landscape Architects (ASLA) as well as the Canadian Society of Landscape Architects, and is a member of the Royal Canadian Academy of Arts. Vaughan's 2005 ASLA Fellow nomination profile noted: 
For the past 40 years Don Vaughan has been the face of landscape architecture in Vancouver and much of Western Canada. It is no exaggeration to say that by the sheer number, size, and significance of his projects he has influenced the urban fabric of Vancouver, contributing to the scenic and cosmopolitan city that we know today. Through his work and his energy on design teams and review boards, Don has been a design leader and innovator, rallying the design professions—architects, landscape architects and planners—on major projects to his higher vision of what is possible. His legacy is impressive, including countless projects enjoyed by millions and an undeniable influence on the landscape architecture profession in Vancouver.

Other projects 

Ambleside Park, Granite Assemblage, Ambleside, West Vancouver
 Bentall Centre and the Burrard Street ALRT Station, Art Phillips Park (formerly Discovery Square), Downtown Vancouver
David Lam Park, Marking High Tide and Waiting for Low Tide, Yaletown, Vancouver
Metrotown Civic Plaza, Metrotown Shopping Center, Burnaby, British Columbia
Sun Life Plaza, Vancouver
University of Victoria, Victoria, British Columbia
Whistler Village, Whistler, British Columbia

References

External links
 Don Vaughan's Wordpress blog
 History of Vaughan Landscape Planning and Design
 Surroundings Episode 1: "Landscape Architects and Public Art: Bringing Meaning to Place Through Sculpture" video featuring Don Vaughan, from Rain City Productions

1937 births
Living people
American emigrants to Canada
Architects from Oregon
American landscape architects
Canadian landscape architects
University of Oregon alumni
Emily Carr University of Art and Design alumni
People from Coos Bay, Oregon
People from Vancouver
Members of the Royal Canadian Academy of Arts